The Reading Express were a professional indoor football team based in Reading, Pennsylvania. They were most recently a member of the United Conference of the Indoor Football League (IFL). The Express began play in 2006, as an expansion team of the American Indoor Football League. The team was originally going to be named the Reading RiverRats, but passed on that name in favor of the "Reading Express." The RiverRats name and logo was moved to an AIFA team in Pittsburgh in 2007. The owners of the Express were Ted & Lisa Lavender. They played their home games at the Sovereign Center.

Franchise history

2006
On September 14, 2005, the Express were announced as an expansion team of the American Indoor Football League (AIFL). On November 6, 2005, the Express named Ollie Guidry the team's first ever head coach.

On Sunday, March 26, 2006, the Express won the AIFL's very first overtime game 41-38 against the Johnstown Riverhawks on the road, as kicker Erik Rockhold booted the game-winning 45-yard field goal.

On Friday, May 12, 2006, the Express managed to knock the Erie Freeze out of the #1 spot in the conference by getting revenge 59-48.

At the end of their inaugural year, the Express held the highest record in the AIFL's Northern Conference, at 12-2. This, however, was padded by two games against amateur outdoor franchises—the Cumberland Cardinals and a team known as the Philadelphia Scorpions, both of which were blowouts.

In the opening round of the 2006 AIFL Playoffs, the Express managed to knock out the fourth-seeded Huntington Heroes with a 56-23 victory. In the Northern Conference championship game, they faced the second-seeded Canton Legends for the Northern Conference title and a chance to participate in the American Bowl.  Unfortunately, the Express got derailed as they got shut out in the second half and fell 44-24.  Even though they fell one game shy of the league championship, it wasn't a total loss, as wide receiver Carmelo Ocasio was named the 2006 Northern Conference Offensive MVP.

2007
In the 2007 season, now part of the AIFL's reorganized form (the American Indoor Football Association), the Express built on their success in the previous season, finishing a league-best 14-2 in the regular season, defeating the Pittsburgh RiverRats 42-24 in the first round, and defeating the Canton Legends 66-51 to claim the Northern Conference Championship and earn a trip to AIFA Championship Bowl I at the Florence Civic Center.  Unfortunately, the Express got derailed yet again, losing to the Lakeland Thunderbolts 54-49.

Season Schedule

2008

Season Schedule

2009
In the 2009 season, the Express had another fantastic season, finishing the regular season 11-3, defeating the Baltimore Mariners 50-20 in the first round, and defeating the Columbus Lions 60-51 in the conference championship game to earn another berth in the AIFA Championship Bowl III in Casper, Wyoming.  This time in the title game, the Express were overpowering and they defeated the Wyoming Cavalry 65-42 to win their first AIFA championship.

Season Schedule

2010

2011

On July 21, 2010, the Express announced that they would be promoting interim head coach/offensive coordinator, Chris Thompson, to head coach for the 2011 season. On August 18, 2010, the Express announced that will be leaving the AIFA and joining the Indoor Football League (IFL).

2012

Final roster

Head coaches
Note: Statistics are correct through the end of the 2012 Indoor Football League season.

Season-By-Season 

|-
| colspan="6" style="text-align:center;"| Reading Express (AIFL)
|-
|2006 || 12 || 2 || 0 || 1st Northern || Won Round 1 (Huntington)Lost NC Championship (Canton)
|-
| colspan="6" style="text-align:center;"| Reading Express (AIFA)
|-
|2007 || 14 || 2 || 0 || 1st Northern || Won Round 1 (Pittsburgh)Won NC Championship (Canton)Lost AIFA Championship Bowl I (Lakeland)
|-
|2008 || 10 || 4 || 0 || 1st EC Northern || Won ECN Round 1 (Erie)Lost EC Championship (Florence)
|-
|2009 || 11 || 3 || 0 || 1st Northern || Won Divisional (Baltimore)Won Semifinal (Columbus)Won AIFA Championship Bowl III (Wyoming)
|-
|2010 || 8 || 6 || 0 || 4th Eastern || --
|-
| colspan="6" style="text-align:center;"| Reading Express (IFL)
|-
|2011 || 8 || 6 || 0 || 1st Atlantic || Won Round 1 (Chicago)Lost Conference Semi-Final (Green Bay)
|-
|2012 || 2 || 12 || 0 || 8th United || --
|-
!Totals || 73 || 39 || 0
|colspan="2"| (including playoffs)

References

External links 
 Official Site of the Reading Express
 Express' 2006 Season & Results
 Official Site of the Reading Express Smokin' Hot Steam Team
 Express's 2007 Stats
 Express's 2008 Stats
 Express's 2009 Stats
 Express's 2010 Stats

 
2006 establishments in Pennsylvania
2012 disestablishments in Pennsylvania